Derek Jonathanpope Doneen (born March 27, 1987) is an American documentary film director, editor and producer. He is best known for his work on the feature documentary The Price of Free and the Netflix documentary series Heist.

Life and career
Doneen was born in Los Angeles, California on March 27, 1987. He graduated from Chapman University's Dodge College of Film and Media Arts. He started his career as an in-house filmmaker at Participant Media. In 2018, he directed the feature documentary The Price of Free, about Nobel Prize winner Kailash Satyarthi, which premiered at the Sundance Film Festival and won the Sundance Grand Jury Prize. He was named one of Variety's 2018 top 10 documentary filmmakers and listed in DOC NYC's "40 Under 40" list for 2018.

In 2021, Doneen co-directed the Netflix documentary series Heist, along with Nick Frew and Martin Desmond Roe, about  the story of three heists.

Filmography

Awards and nominations

References

External links 
 
 

Living people
American documentary film directors
American documentary film producers
People from California
1987 births